Sara Hughes (born 1971) is a Canadian-born New Zealand artist.

Background 
Hughes was born in 1971 in Vancouver, British Columbia, Canada. She graduated in 2001 from the Elam School of Fine Arts with a Masters of Fine Arts.

Career 
Hughes is a painter and installation artist.

Hughes is represented in Auckland by Gow Langsford Gallery and in Melbourne by Sutton Gallery.

Work by Hughes is included in a number of public collections including the Auckland Art Gallery Toi o Tāmaki, Museum of New Zealand Te Papa Tongarewa, and the National Gallery of Australia.

Awards 
 2008/09 Creative New Zealand Berlin Visual Artists Residency
 2008 Artist-in-Residence at the McColl Center for Art + Innovation in Charlotte, NC
 2005 won the Wallace Arts Trust paramount award
 2005 Norsewear Art Award
 2003 Frances Hodgkins Fellowship

References

Further reading 
Artist files for Sara Hughes are held at:
 Angela Morton Collection, Takapuna Library 
 Te Aka Matua Research Library, Museum of New Zealand Te Papa Tongarewa 
 Fine Arts Library, Te Herenga Toi The University of Auckland Libraries and Learning Services 
 E. H. McCormick Research Library, Auckland Art Gallery Toi o Tāmaki 
 Hocken Collections Uare Taoka o Hākena 
 Christchurch Art Gallery Te Puna o Waiwhetu

External links 
 Official website

1971 births
Living people
Artists from Vancouver
Elam Art School alumni
New Zealand painters
New Zealand women painters
Canadian painters
Canadian women painters